John Knight Fotheringham FBA (14 August 1874 – 12 December 1936) was a British historian who was an expert on ancient astronomy and chronology. He established the chronology of the Babylonian dynasties.

J.K. Fotheringham was educated at the City of London School and Merton College, Oxford, where he held an exhibition and received first class degrees in Literae Humaniores (1896) and modern history (1897). During 1898–1902, he held a senior demyship at Magdalen College, Oxford, and started to study ancient chronology. In 1904, he was appointed a lecturer in classical literature at King's College London and taught there until 1915.

Fotheringham was a Fellow at Magdalen College (1909–16). He was a Reader in ancient history at the University of London (1912–20). He was later Reader in ancient astronomy and chronology at the University of Oxford (1925–36).

J.K. Fotheringham edited Saint Jerome's version of Eusebius' Chronicle in 1923.
He was elected a Fellow of the British Academy in 1933. He was also a Fellow of the Royal Astronomical Society.

Selected books 
Fotheringham published a number of papers and books, including the following:

 The Bodleian Manuscript of Jerome's Version of the Chronicle of Eusebius, editor (Oxford: The Clarendon Press, 1905)
 The History of England, from Addington's Administration to the Close of William IV's Reign 1801–1837, Volume XI, with George Charles Brodrick (Longmans, Green, 1906)
 Marco Sanudo, conqueror of the Archipelago, with L.R.F. Williams (Oxford: The Clarendon Press, 1915)
 Cleostratus (London: Clay, 1920)
 Historical eclipses (Oxford: The Clarendon Press, 1921)
 The  calendar (London: H.M. Stationery Office, 1929)
 Ancient astronomy and chronology (The Oxford Magazine, 1930)
  Astronomical evidence for the date of the crucifixion

References

External links
 
 
 Obituaries of John Knight Fotheringham (1874–1936)

1874 births
1936 deaths
People educated at the City of London School
Alumni of Merton College, Oxford
English historians
Historians of science
Historians of astronomy
Academics of King's College London
Academics of the University of London
Fellows of Magdalen College, Oxford
Fellows of the British Academy
English male non-fiction writers